This is a list of U.S. county name etymologies, covering the letters E to I.

E

F

G

H

I

See also

Lists of U.S. county name etymologies for links to the remainder of the list

Notes and references